Branston railway station was a railway station serving the village of Branston in Staffordshire.

History
In 1887 local residents began to petition the Midland Railway for a station with the support of their local MP, Sydney Evershed. The railway company agreed and the station was subsequently opened on 1 October 1889.

It was situated between Tamworth and Burton upon Trent stations on the line originally built by the Birmingham and Derby Junction Railway.

With the arrival of local bus services, passenger numbers decreased and the last train called on Sunday 21 September 1930.

Stationmasters
James Collins 1889 - 1891 (afterwards station master at Haselour)
J.J.W. Grundy 1891 - 1894 (afterwards station master at Wednesfield)
G.W. King 1894 - 1898 (afterwards station master at Darfield)
W. Lee 1898 - 1906
From 1906 a porter from Burton station was put in charge.

Route

References

Disused railway stations in Staffordshire
Railway stations in Great Britain opened in 1889
Former Midland Railway stations
Railway stations in Great Britain closed in 1930